IDL Drug Stores or the Independent Drugstores League was a cooperative of independent drugstores that disbanded in the late 1960s. Several drugstores retain the IDL name, including Seebers IDL in Newport, Washington and Schneiders IDL in Minneapolis, Minnesota. Among their promotional items were baseball trading cards.

Retailers' cooperatives in the United States
Defunct pharmacies of the United States